Mohammed Shaaban (Arabic: محمد شعبان) (born 1 September 1993) is a Qatari footballer. He currently plays for Al-Kharaitiyat .

References

External links
 

Qatari footballers
1993 births
Living people
Al-Sailiya SC players
Al-Arabi SC (Qatar) players
Al-Markhiya SC players
Al-Khor SC players
Al-Shamal SC players
Al Kharaitiyat SC players
Naturalised citizens of Qatar
Qatar Stars League players
Qatari Second Division players
Association football midfielders